Gmunden Laakirchen Airfield is a recreational airfield located  northeast of Gmunden, Oberösterreich, Austria.

See also
List of airports in Austria

References

External links 
 Airport record for Gmunden Laakirchen Airport at Landings.com

Airports in Austria
Upper Austria